Monsieur is a 1911 silent short romantic drama film produced by the Edison Manufacturing Company. It starred Marc McDermott and Miriam Nesbitt a husband and wife acting couple. General Film Company released the film.

Cast
Marc McDermott
Miriam Nesbitt
Robert Conness
Nancy Avril

References

External links
Monsieur at IMDb.com

1911 films
American silent short films
Edison Manufacturing Company films
American black-and-white films
American romantic drama films
1911 romantic drama films
1911 short films
1910s American films
Silent romantic drama films
Silent American drama films